Hyalimax maillardi is a species of air-breathing succineid land slug, a terrestrial pulmonate gastropod mollusk in the family Succineidae, the amber snails.

Distribution
This species is endemic to Réunion.

References

Succineidae
Gastropods described in 1867
Endemic fauna of Réunion
Taxa named by Paul Henri Fischer